Fast Duplicate File Finder is a Windows tool developed by MindGems Inc, available as a freeware version and a full commercial version. It is intended to scan a user's computer for duplicate files, display a list of such files and let the user delete unneeded copies with the purpose of freeing up hard drive space.  It is compatible with all Microsoft Windows versions including the latest Windows 8, Windows 7 and all Windows Server operating systems and their corresponding 32 and 64 bit versions.

Reception
The product has received positive reviews. PCWorld.com, as of March 2, 2011, was positive about the speed, Overclocker.com commented on the quality of the results, whilst CNET observed the finding similar files being slower and that the free version was limited compared to the Pro version.

References

External links
 Fast Duplicate File Finder

File managers